Justus von Dohnányi (born 2 December 1960) is a German actor, best known for portraying Wilhelm Burgdorf in 2004 film Der Untergang.

Life and career
Born in Lübeck, von Dohnányi is the son of conductor Christoph von Dohnányi and actress Renate Zillessen and a member of the well-known Dohnányi family. His grandfather was Hans von Dohnanyi, German jurist and German resistance fighter and his great-uncle was Dietrich Bonhoeffer, Lutheran pastor and a co-founder of the Confessing Church, both of whom were executed by the Third Reich. His great-grandfather was Ernst von Dohnányi, a notable composer of Hungarian origin.

Dohnányi studied acting at the Hochschule für Musik und Theater Hamburg. He appeared on the legitimate stage in Hamburg, Zürich, and Frankfurt before working in television, where he appeared in several television movies.

He appeared in the 2004 film Downfall as Wilhelm Burgdorf. He had a prominent role in the 2001 movie The Experiment as a prison guard, opposite Moritz Bleibtreu and Christian Berkel, who also appeared in Downfall. He received the 2001 Lola for Best Supporting Actor. In 2014 he appears alongside Matt Damon, Jean Dujardin and others in the movie The Monuments Men. He is featured in the 2015 film Woman in Gold as the representative of the Belvedere Gallery who attempts to keep the title-painting, stolen by the Nazis, from being returned to its rightful owner, Maria Altmann.

Selected filmography 

Jakob the Liar (1999) – Preuss
The World Is Not Enough (1999) – Captain Nikolai 
 (2000) – Eberhard Bethge
Das Experiment (2001) – Berus – Strafvollzugsbeamter / Guard
Amen. (2002) – Göran von Otter
September (2003) – Philipp Scholz
Blueprint (2003) – Thomas Weber
Before the Fall (2004) – Gauleiter Heinrich Stein
Downfall (2004) – General Wilhelm Burgdorf
 (2005) – Harry
 (2005) – Erik Larsen
Vineta (2006) – Lutz Born
 (2007) – Richter (segment "Artikel 5")
 (2007, also director) – Sven Hansen
Hardcover (2008) – Chico Waidner
1½ Knights – In Search of the Ravishing Princess Herzelinde (2008) – Bernd
Buddenbrooks (2008) – Bendix Grünlich
Men in the City (2009) – Bruce Berger
Der grosse Kater (2010) – Magun
Jew Suss: Rise and Fall (2010) – Veit Harlan
 (2010) – Johannes
Lessons of a Dream (2011) – Richard Hartung
 (2011) – Bruce Berger
Yoko (2012) – Prof. Kellerman
 (2012) – Joachim Ebling
A Coffee in Berlin (2012) – Karl Speckenbach
Ludwig II (2012) – Johann (Freiherr von) Lutz
Hanni & Nanni 3 (2013) – Hugh Gordon
 (2013, TV film) – Richard Wagner
The Monuments Men (2014) – Viktor Stahl
Frau Müller muss weg! (2015) – Wolf Heider
Woman in Gold (2015) – Dreimann
 (2015) – Ed
 (2015) – Schulrat Henning
Der Hund begraben (2016) – Hans
 (2017) – Baron Lefuet
Charité (2017, TV series, 6 episodes) – Robert Koch
 (2017) – Ulrich Dattelmann
 (2018) – René König
 (2022) – René König

References

External links

1960 births
Living people
20th-century German male actors
21st-century German male actors
Actors from Lübeck
Justus
German male film actors
German people of Hungarian descent
Hochschule für Musik und Theater Hamburg alumni
Male actors from Hamburg